Assaad Andraos (6 July 1945 – before 2012) was a Lebanese sports shooter. He competed in the trap event at the 1972 Summer Olympics.

References

1945 births
Year of death missing
Lebanese male sport shooters
Olympic shooters of Lebanon
Shooters at the 1972 Summer Olympics
Place of birth missing